Zeradina fedosovi is a species of sea snail, a marine gastropod mollusk in the family Vanikoridae.

Original description
   Poppe G.T., Tagaro S.P. & Goto Y. (2018). New marine species from the Central Philippines. Visaya. 5(1): 91-135.
page(s): 100, pl. 6 figs 4–5.

References

External links
 Worms Link

Vanikoridae